Ján Arpáš (7 November 1917 – 16 April 1976) was a Slovak football player. He played for Slovakia. In his country he played for ŠK Slovan Bratislava. In Italy he played for Juventus FC.

He also played twelve times for Slovakia between 1939 and 1944, including scoring his country's first international goal, against Germany on 27 August 1939.

Career statistics

International goals

References

External links
Mention of Ján Arpáš' death

1917 births
1976 deaths
Footballers from Bratislava
Slovak footballers
Czechoslovak footballers
ŠK Slovan Bratislava players
Juventus F.C. players
Serie A players
Czechoslovak expatriate footballers
Expatriate footballers in Italy
Slovakia international footballers
Czechoslovak expatriate sportspeople in Italy
Association football forwards